Aarbakke is a surname. Notable people with the surname include:

Ingvil Aarbakke (1970–2005), Norwegian artist
Jarle Aarbakke (born 1942), rector at the University of Tromsø
Magnus Aarbakke (born 1934), Norwegian judge

Norwegian-language surnames